Peetri is a small borough in Järva Parish, Järva County in northern Estonia.

References

External links
Satellite map at Maplandia.com

Boroughs and small boroughs in Estonia